Arnold Seymour Relman (June 17, 1923 – June 17, 2014) — known as Bud Relman to intimates — was an American internist and professor of medicine and social medicine. He was editor of The New England Journal of Medicine (NEJM) from 1977 to 1991, where he instituted two important policies: one asking the popular press not to report on articles before publication and another requiring authors to disclose conflicts of interest. He wrote extensively on medical publishing and reform of the U.S. health care system, advocating non-profit delivery of single-payer health care. Relman ended his career as professor emeritus at Harvard Medical School in Boston, Massachusetts.

Biography
Relman was born in Queens, New York, in 1923. 

He was educated at Cornell University and the College of Physicians and Surgeons at Columbia University. After Medical school, he contracted tuberculosis. Although an antibiotic called streptomycin had finally been developed by that time, Relman eschewed the opportunity to use it as he feared its side effects which were most toxic. The years of rest without streptomycin delayed his career and during this time he read Thomas Mann's novel "Magic Mountain" about the experience of patients in a tuberculosis sanitarium. The work affected him greatly and he never failed to recommend the work to medical students on his service. He was first professor at Boston University School of Medicine, then Frank Wister Thomas professor of medicine and chair of the department of medicine at the University of Pennsylvania School of Medicine (now the Perelman School of Medicine), and finally a professor at Harvard Medical School.

Relman was editor of the Journal of Clinical Investigation from 1962 to 1967. He was editor of The New England Journal of Medicine (NEJM) from 1977 to 1991.

Relman was the only person to have been president of the American Federation for Clinical Research, the American Society for Clinical Investigation and the Association of American Physicians. In 1988 he was awarded Honorary Fellowship by the New York University School of Medicine.

Relman died in Cambridge, Massachusetts of melanoma in 2014 at the age of 91. He was married to Harriet Vitkin for 40 years, and together they had three children, David Relman, John Relman, and Margaret Relman Batten. His second wife Marcia Angell also served as editor of NEJM and was the first woman to do so.

Views

On for-profit health care
Relman was an uncompromising critic of the American health care system as a profit-driven industry. He once said, "The medical profession is being bought by the pharmaceutical industry, not only in terms of the practice of medicine, but also in terms of teaching and research. The academic institutions of this country are allowing themselves to be the paid agents of the pharmaceutical industry. I think it’s disgraceful."
 
He coined the term "medical–industrial complex." He deplored the increasing treatment of health care in the US as a "market commodity" distributed according to a patient's ability to pay, not medical need. He believed that the solution would come only by two fundamental structural reforms: implementation of a single-payer financing system like Medicare without investor-owned private insurance companies and provision of a non-profit delivery system, with multi-specialty groups of physicians paid by salary within a preset budget.

In 1999, Relman participated in a Harvard Medical School debate on the subject of unionization of physicians and for-profit health care. His stance was described:
 "Although he believes that managed care is here to stay, the current 'marketplace' state of health care is not viable. In order for the system to work, it is going to have to be 'not-for-profit, community-based, and run by doctors and local health care institutions with the support of community groups.' Keeping the big picture in mind, Relman said, 'Unions are unnecessary in a not-for-profit sector.'"

On alternative medicine
Relman was a decided skeptic regarding the Alternative, Complementary and Integrative Medicine movement. In 1998 he wrote:

There are not two kinds of medicine, one conventional and the other unconventional, that can be practiced jointly in a new kind of "integrative medicine." Nor...are there two kinds of thinking, or two ways to find out which treatments work and which do not. In the best kind of medical practice, all proposed treatments must be tested objectively. In the end, there will only be treatments that pass that test and those that do not, those that are proven worthwhile and those that are not. Can there be any reasonable "alternative"?

Works

Relman, Arnold S. "The New Medical-Industrial Complex". N Engl J Med 303(17):963-70, 1980. doi: 10.1056/NEJM198010233031703

References

Further reading

External links 

 Arnold S. Relman papers, 1953-2011 (inclusive), 1974-2011 (bulk). H MS c353. Harvard Medical Library, Francis A. Countway Library of Medicine, Boston, Mass.

1923 births
2014 deaths
Physicians from Massachusetts
Cornell University alumni
Harvard Medical School faculty
The New England Journal of Medicine people
Critics of alternative medicine
Columbia University Vagelos College of Physicians and Surgeons alumni
Medical journal editors
Journal of Clinical Investigation editors
Members of the National Academy of Medicine